Jan Rolstad (born 17 August 1950) is a retired Norwegian race walker.

He finished 21st in the 20 km race at the 1971 European Championships and eleventh at the 1972 Summer Olympics.

References

1950 births
Living people
Norwegian male racewalkers

Athletes (track and field) at the 1972 Summer Olympics
Olympic athletes of Norway